The Union Bay station is located in the town of Union Bay, British Columbia. The station was a flag stop on Via Rail's Dayliner service. Service ended in 2011.

Footnotes

External links 
Via Rail Station Description

Via Rail stations in British Columbia
Disused railway stations in Canada